Vivian Alphonsus "Viv" Dunn (27 July 1895 – 19 October 1974) was a rugby union player who represented Australia.

Dunn, a number eight, was born in Junee, New South Wales and claimed a total of 7 international rugby caps for Australia.

References

                   

1895 births
1974 deaths
Australia international rugby union players
Australian rugby union players
Rugby union players from Junee
Rugby union number eights